Robert Bernard Alter (born 1935) is an American professor of Hebrew and comparative literature at the University of California, Berkeley, where he has taught since 1967. He published his translation of the Hebrew Bible in 2018.

Biography
Robert Alter earned his bachelor's degree in English (Columbia University, 1957), and his master's degree (1958) and doctorate (1962) from Harvard University in comparative literature. He started his career as a writer at Commentary, where he was for many years a contributing editor. He has written twenty-three books, and is noted most recently for his translation of the entire Hebrew Bible. He lectures on topics varying from Biblical episodes to Kafka's modernism and Hebrew literature.

Biblical studies
One of Alter's important contributions is the introduction of the type scene into contemporary scholarly Hebrew Bible studies. An example of a type scene is that of a man meeting a young woman at a well, whom he goes on to marry; this scene occurs twice in Genesis and once in Exodus, and, according to Alter, distortedly in 1 Samuel and in the Book of Ruth.

Honors
Alter has served as an active member of the Council of Scholars of the Library of Congress, and as the president of the Association of Literary Scholars and Critics. He was a Guggenheim Fellow in 1966 and 1978. He was elected a Fellow of the American Academy of Arts and Sciences in 1986. In 2001, he was elected a member of the American Philosophical Society. He was a Senior Fellow of the National Endowment for the Humanities, a fellow at the Institute for Advanced Studies in Jerusalem, and Old Dominion Fellow at Princeton University.  He is a member of the Editorial Board of the Jewish Review of Books.

Awards
His book The Art of Biblical Narrative won the National Jewish Book Award for Jewish Thought. In 2009, he was the recipient of the Robert Kirsch Award (Los Angeles Times) for lifetime contribution to American letters. He was awarded an honorary Doctor of Humanities degree by Yale University in 2010. He is a Doctor Honoris Causa of Hebrew University (2015).

 Berkeley Citation (2010)

Selected works
Translations of the Hebrew Bible
 The David Story: A Translation with Commentary of 1 and 2 Samuel, 1999, W.W. Norton, 
 The Five Books of Moses: A Translation with Commentary, 2004, W.W. Norton, 
 The Book of Psalms: A Translation with Commentary, 2007, W.W. Norton, 
 The Book of Genesis, translation by Robert Alter, illustrated by R. Crumb, 2009, W.W. Norton (first edition, 1996), 
 The Wisdom Books: Job, Proverbs, and Ecclesiastes: A Translation with Commentary, 2010, W.W. Norton, 
 Ancient Israel: The Former Prophets: Joshua, Judges, Samuel, and Kings: A Translation with Commentary, 2013, W.W. Norton, 
 Strong As Death Is Love: Song of Songs Ruth Esther Jonah And Daniel: A Translation with Commentary, 2015, W.W. Norton, 
 The Hebrew Bible: A Translation with Commentary, 2018, W.W. Norton, 

Other works
 Rogue's Progress: Studies in the Picaresque Novel, 1965, Harvard University Press
Partial Magic: The Novel as a Self-Conscious Genre, 1975, University of California Press, 
 A Lion for Love: A Critical Biography of Stendhal, in collaboration with Carol Cosman, 1979, Basic Books, 
 The Art of Biblical Narrative, 1981, Basic Books, 
 Motives for Fiction, 1984, Harvard University Press, 
 The Art of Biblical Poetry, 1985, Basic Books, 
 The Literary Guide to the Bible Edited by Alter and Frank Kermode, 1987, Harvard University Press, 
 The Invention of Hebrew Prose: Modern Fiction and the Language Revolution, 1988, University of Washington Press.
 Pleasures of Reading in an Ideological Age, 1990, W.W. Norton, 
 Necessary Angels: Tradition and Modernity in Kafka, Benjamin, and Scholem, 1991, Harvard University Press, 
 Imagined Cities: Urban Experience and the Novel, 2005, Yale University Press, 
 Pen of Iron: American Prose and the King James Bible, 2010, Princeton University Press, 
 The Art of Bible Translation, 2019, Princeton University Press, 
 Nabokov and the Real World: Between Appreciation and Defense, 2021,  Princeton University Press,

References

External links
CV on UCBerkeley's website
Biography at Washington University in St. Louis
The Five Books of Moses review at The New Yorker
The Five Books of Moses review at The Washington Post
The Five Books of Moses review by Alan Jacobs in First Things (Aug/Sept. 2005)
The Book of Psalms review at The New Yorker
Audio interview with Robert Alter
Robert Alter's articles in the London Review of Books
The Hebrew Bible, 3 vols., reviewed by Gary A. Rendsburg at Moment Magazine
Sample chapter of Alter's translation of Genesis

1935 births
Living people
Columbia College (New York) alumni
Harvard Graduate School of Arts and Sciences alumni
University of California, Berkeley College of Letters and Science faculty
Fellows of the American Academy of Arts and Sciences
American biblical scholars
Jewish American academics
Translators of the Bible into English
Jewish translators of the Bible
Translators from Hebrew
Translators to English
American literary critics
Bible commentators
Old Testament scholars
21st-century American Jews
Members of the American Philosophical Society